Anandan (15 June 1933 – 25 March 1989), born as C. L. Anandan, was an Indian actor and producer who was active in Tamil cinema as well in Malayalam cinema during the second half of the 20th century. He was well known for his hero, supporting, and villain roles. In a career spanning close to three decades, he acted in about 60 films in Tamil and Malayalam, in which 25 films had him as hero. Anandan debuted in a supporting role in the Tamil movie Thandhai, and later he holds the heroic role in Vijayapuri Veeran. He made a move on the Malayalam film industry; Kaattumaina was his first Malayalam movie, which was also re-shot in Tamil. He appeared in a song sequence "Us Paar Saajan" as a fisherman dancer from the Hindi film Chori Chori (1956).

Early life
Anandan was born in Salem, Tamil Nadu. His mother tongue is Tamil.

Personal life
Anandan married Lakshmi, the couple has four daughters and three sons. Anandan is the father of actresses Disco Shanti and Lalitha Kumari.

Film career
Initially, C. L. Anandan was doing supporting roles in many films. He was introduced by Citadel Films as the hero in their production Vijayapuri Veeran, released in the year 1960. He won the hearts of the cine-goers through his versatility, which he displayed in sword fighting and horse-riding. He reached heights through his film Veerathirumagan, released in the year 1962. The film catapulted him to the film industry's big league of happening stars. The film helped his heroine Sachu also climb the rungs of the success ladder. He owned his own production company known as "Aanandan Movies", where the movie Nanum Manidhandhaan was his first production. He was frequently paired with actress Rajasree in most of his films such as Magaley Un Samathu, Kubera Theevu, Sengamala Theevu and Yanai Valartha Vanampadi Magan.

Filmography
C. L. Anandan acted in about 60 films in Tamil and Malayalam.

This list is complete.

Tamil

Thandhai (1953)
Thangamalai Ragasiyam (1957)
Sengottai Singam (1958)
Vijayapuri Veeran (1960)
Kongunattu Thangam (1961)
Veerathirumagan (1962)
Neeya Naana? (1962)
Sengamala Theevu (1962)
Naagamalai Azhagi (1962)
Kaattumaina (1963)
Kubera Theevu (1963)
Nanum Manidhandhaan (1964)
Magaley Un Samathu (1964)
Kalyana Mandapam (1965)
Thayin Mel Aanai (1965)
Maganey Kel (1965)
Yaar Nee? (1966)
Lorry Driver (1966)
Thanipiravi (1966)
Ethirigal Jakkirathai (1967)
Ninaivil Nindraval (1967)
Moondrezhuthu (1968)
Ponnu Mappillai (1969)
Atthai Magal (1969)
Naangu Killadigal (1969)
Manasatchi (1969)
CID Shankar (1970)
Thulli Odum Pulliman (1971)
Deivam Pesuma (1971)
Neerum Neruppum (1971)
Yanai Valartha Vanampadi Magan (1971)
 Jakkamma (1972)
Malai Naattu Mangai (1973)
Chittu Kuruvi (1978)
Vallavan Varugiran (1979)
Naan Potta Savaal (1980)
Kanni Theevu (1981)
Kodugal Illatha Kolam (1983)
Thanikattu Raja (1983)
Adutha Varisu (1983)
Madurai Sooran (1984)
Oomai Vizhigal (1986)
Elan Kandru (1985)
Senthoora Poove (1988) as Ponni's father

Malayalam
Achan (1952)
Kaattumaina (1963)
Kaattumallika (1966)
Aana Valarthiya Vanampadiyude Makan (1971)
Prathikaram (1972)
Kaadu (1973)
Vanadevatha (1976) as Sathram Watcher

Hindi
 Chori Chori (1956)

References 

Male actors in Malayalam cinema
Male actors in Tamil cinema
1933 births
1989 deaths